Troynichevskaya is a rural locality (a village) in Osinovskoye Rural Settlement of Vinogradovsky District, Arkhangelsk Oblast, Russia. The population was 26 as of 2010.

Geography 
Troynichevskaya is located 30 km southeast of Bereznik (the district's administrative centre) by road. Selivanovskaya is the nearest rural locality.

References 

Rural localities in Vinogradovsky District